This is a list of people elected Fellow of the Royal Society in 2005.

Fellows 

James Barber
Martin Thomas Barlow
Laurence David Barron
Andrew Blake
Harry Leonard Bryden
Stephen John Williams Busby
Luca Cardelli
Deborah Charlesworth
John Collinge
Paul Bruce Corkum
John Patrick Croxall
Tom Curran
John Francis Xavier Diffley
Julian Downward
Ronald David Ekers
Robert Evans
Philip Richard Evans
Alastair Hugh Fitter
Uta Frith
David Christopher Gadsby
Douglas Roland Higgs
Brian Leslie Norman Kennett
David William Masser
Thomas Guy Masters
Thomas Fulton Wilson McKillop
Goverdhan Mehta
Roger Ervin Miller
Michael John Morgan

John Richard Anthony Pearson
Philip Power
Nicholas Jarvis Proudfoot
Trevor William Robbins
Douglas Alan Ross
Philip St John Russell
Peter John Sadler
Christopher Maxwell Snowden
David John Spiegelhalter
Robert Daniel St Johnston
Lloyd Nicholas Trefethen
Richard Samuel Ward
Colin Watts
John Graham White
Ernest Marshall Wright

Foreign members

Raoul Bott
Catherine Jeanne Cesarsky
Ilkka Aulis Hanski
Hartmut Michel
Ryoji Noyori
Harold Eliot Varmus

Honorary Fellow 

Leonard Wolfson

2005
2005 in science
2005 in the United Kingdom